Darong class transport (AP)/troopship (APT) is a class of auxiliary ship built in the People’s Republic of China (PRC) for the People's Liberation Army Navy (PLAN). Intended as a successor of Qiongsha-class cargo ship, the exact domestic Chinese type designation remains unknown, so this class is identified by its NATO reporting name Darong class. Specification:

Darong class in PLAN service is designated by a combination of two Chinese characters followed by a three-digit number. The second Chinese character is Yun (运), meaning transport in Chinese. The first Chinese character denotes which fleet the ship is service with, with East (Dong, 东) for East Sea Fleet, North (Bei, 北) for North Sea Fleet, and South (Nan, 南) for South Sea Fleet. However, the pennant numbers are subject to change due to the change of Chinese naval ships naming convention, or when units are transferred to different fleets. As of 2022, a total of two ships have been identified:

References

Auxiliary ships of the People's Liberation Army Navy
Ships of the People's Liberation Army Navy